Platycheirus podagratus is a species of hoverfly. It is found in the Holarctic.

Description
Tibiae 1 is strongly and rapidly broadened on apical third (slightly narrower apically than preapically). Leg 3 is black with yellow knee. Abdomen is slender.

See references for determination.

Distribution
Palearctic: Fennoscandia south to the Pyrenees, Ireland eastward through Northern Europe and mountainous parts of Central Europe into Russia and on to Southeast Siberia. Nearctic: Alberta and Ontario.

Biology
Habitat: Fen, margins of lakes, rivers and brooks in unimproved grassland, taiga and moor; unimproved montane and alpine grassland.
It flies end of May to mid-August.

References

Diptera of Europe
Diptera of North America
Syrphinae
Insects described in 1838